Joutsa is a municipality of Finland. It is located in the province of Western Finland and is part of the Central Finland region.

The municipality has a population of 
which 
is water. The population density is
.

The municipality is unilingually Finnish. The municipality of Leivonmäki was consolidated with Joutsa on January 1, 2008.

Sahti culture in Joutsa is known by Joutsan sahti.

Geography

Neighbouring municipalities: Hartola, Hirvensalmi, Jyväskylä, Kangasniemi, Luhanka, Pertunmaa and Toivakka.

There are all together 192 lakes in Joutsa. The biggest lakes are Puula, Suontee and Jääsjärvi.

Leivonmäki National Park is located in Joutsa. At area is swamps, beaches and forest in esker.

Villages

 Havumäki
 Kivisuo
 Kälä
 Laitjärvi
 Lapinkylä
 Leivonmäki
 Marjotaipale
 Pärnämäki
 Ruokoranta
 Ruorasmäki
 Rutalahti
 Savenaho
 Selänpohja
 Taka-Ikola
 Tammilahti
 Tolvasniemi
 Vehmaa

Media
Newspapers: 
Joutsan seutu is published in Joutsa and Luhanka.
Itä-Häme

Twinnings
 Tähtvere Parish, Estonia
 Finspång, Sweden

References

External links

Municipality of Joutsa – Official website, finnish